The 1998 European Curling Championships were held in Flims, Switzerland December 5-12.

Men's

A Tournament

Group A

Group B

B Tournament

Group A

Playoffs

Medals

Women's

Group A

Group B

Playoffs

Medals

References
Men: 
Women: 

European Curling Championships, 1998
European Curling Championships, 1998
European Curling Championships
Curling competitions in Switzerland
International sports competitions hosted by Switzerland
1998 in European sport